Longworth Road is a residential road in Walton Manor, North Oxford, England.

Location 
The road runs southwest–northeast, between a junction with Southmoor Road and Walton Well Road to the southwest and Kingston Road opposite Leckford Road to the northeast. To the south is the district of Jericho.

History 
Houses in the road were originally leased between 1887 and 1890 as part of the North Oxford estate of St John's College. The street was named in 1890–1, probably after the village of Longworth, historically in Berkshire and now in Oxfordshire, with St John's College connections.

At the southwestern end, at the junction with Walton Well Road, a drinking fountain was installed in 1885 on the site of a water spring.
It was erected by William Ward, who was earlier Mayor of Oxford for the years 1851 and 1861.
The fountain was designed by Harry Wilkinson Moore, architect of many of the houses in the adjoining Southmoor Road, and carved in Portland stone by McCulloch of London.

References 

1890 establishments in England
Streets in Oxford